The Alta Floresta antpitta (Hylopezus whittakeri) is a species of antpitta of the family Grallariidae discovered in 2012.

References

Alta Floresta antpitta
Birds of the Amazon Basin
Endemic birds of Brazil
Alta Floresta antpitta